Major Sir George Frederick Davies, CVO (19 April 1875 – 21 June 1950) was a British Conservative Party politician. He served as a Member of Parliament (MP) for Yeovil from 1923 to 1945.

He was born in Honolulu in the Kingdom of Hawai'i, the son of Theophilus Harris Davies. He was educated at Uppingham School and then at King's College, Cambridge. During the First World War, he served in The Gloucestershire Regiment. He married in 1900, and had two sons and three daughters.

He was briefly British vice-consul in Honolulu. Whilst in parliament, he became an assistant government whip in 1931, served as a Lord Commissioner of the Treasury from 1932 to 1935, Vice-Chamberlain of the Household 1935–37 and Comptroller of the Household 1937–38. He was one of the earliest members of the 1922 Committee.

He was knighted in the 1936 King's Birthday Honours List. and appointed Commander of the Royal Victorian Order the next year.

References

Obituary, The Times, 22 June 1950.

External links 
 

1875 births
1950 deaths
Alumni of King's College, Cambridge
British Army personnel of World War I
Commanders of the Royal Victorian Order
Conservative Party (UK) MPs for English constituencies
Gloucestershire Regiment officers
Knights Bachelor
Ministers in the Chamberlain peacetime government, 1937–1939
People educated at Uppingham School
Politicians awarded knighthoods
Politicians from Honolulu
UK MPs 1923–1924
UK MPs 1924–1929
UK MPs 1929–1931
UK MPs 1931–1935
UK MPs 1935–1945
British expatriates in the Hawaiian Kingdom